Nature's Best is the name of various music releases:
Nature's Best - a compilation album of the top 30 New Zealand songs of the APRA 75th anniversary Top 100 New Zealand songs list, released 14 January 2002. Often referred to as Nature's Best 1.
Nature's Best 2 - a compilation album of the songs numbers 31-65 of the top 100 songs list, released 4 October 2002
Nature's Best 3 - a compilation album of the songs numbers 66-100 of the top 100 songs list, released 12 May 2003
Nature's Best DVD - a compilation DVD of music videos to sixty songs from the Nature's Best albums, released 22 March 2004
Nature's Best Box Set - a limited-edition box set release of the above three albums and DVD, released 29 November 2005
More Nature - a compilation album of twenty notable New Zealand songs more recent than the APRA 75th anniversary list, released 25 January 2006